Karl-Heinz Hoffmann may refer to:

 Heinz Hoffmann or Karl-Heinz Hoffmann (1910–1985), German general
 Karl-Heinz Hoffmann (politician) (born 1928), German Christian Democratic Union politician
 Karl-Heinz Hoffmann (Nazi) (born 1937)

See also
Karl Hoffmann (disambiguation)